This article shows past squads from the Puerto Rican professional volleyball team Leonas de Ponce from the Liga de Voleibol Superior Femenino.

2010
As of February 2010
 Head Coach:  Rafael Olzagasti
 Assistant coach:  José Mieles

2009
As of February 2009
 Head Coach:  Héctor Rentas
 Assistant coach:  Francisco Negrón

 Assistant coach:  Ricardo Rivera

Release or Transfer

2008
As of April 2006
 Head Coach:  Héctor Rentas

2007
As of April 2007
 Head Coach:  Héctor Rentas

Release or Transfer

2006
As of April 2006
 Head Coach:  Rafael Olazagasti
 Assistant coach:  Enrique López

 Assistant coach:  Francisco Negrón

Release or Transfer

2005
As of March 2005
 Head Coach:  Jorge Pérez Vento

Release or Transfer

2004
As of March 2004
 Head Coach:  Jorge Pérez Vento

Release or Transfer

2003
As of March 2003
 Head Coach:  Jorge Pérez Vento
 Assistant coach:  Henry Collazo

 Assistant coach:  Steven Fenosik

Release or Transfer

2002
As of February 2002
 Head Coach:  Kenneth Martínez
 Assistant coach:  Marcos Torres

 Assistant coach:  José Berríos

References

External links
 Pinkin Official Site

Puerto Rican women's volleyball club squads